Boris Georgievich Nuraliev (born 18 July 1958) — is a Soviet and Russian entrepreneur, billionaire, one of the founders of the 1C company and scientist, who heads the «Corporate Information Systems» department at Moscow Institute of Physics and Technology and the «1С» specialised department at the National Research University – Higher School of Economics.

Boris was sanctioned by Poland as part of the sanctions against the 2022 Russian invasion of Ukraine

References 

1958 births
Living people
Academic staff of the Moscow Institute of Physics and Technology
Academic staff of Moscow State University
Academic staff of the Higher School of Economics
Russian billionaires
Russian company founders
Moscow State University of Economics, Statistics, and Informatics alumni